An amyloid is any of certain insoluble fibrous protein aggregates.

Amyloid may also refer to:

 Amyloid (mycology), a chemical reaction used in characterization of fungi
 Amyloid (journal), the Amyloid: the Journal of Protein Folding Disorders peer-reviewed scientific journal

See also
 Active-matrix organic light-emitting diode (AMOLED), a display technology
 Amyl (disambiguation)